William Napleton Molesworth-St Aubyn (18 October 1838 – 29 June 1895) was an English Conservative politician who sat in the House of Commons from 1880 to 1885.

Molesworth-St Aubyn was the son of Rev. Hender Molesworth-St Aubyn of Clowance, Cornwall and his wife Helen Matilda Isabelle Napleton, daughter of Rev. T Napleton of Powderham, Devon. He was educated at Harrow School and Christ Church, Oxford. He was called to the bar at Lincoln's Inn and went on the western circuit and the Devon and Exeter sessions.

At the 1880 general election Molesworth-St Aubyn was elected Member of Parliament for Helston.
He held the seat until the borough was disenfranchised in 1885.
At the 1885 general election, he contested the Truro seat, where he was defeated by the Liberal Party candidate William Bickford-Smith.

Molesworth St Aubyn married Annie Coles, daughter of George Coles of Southsea.

References

External links 

 

1838 births
1895 deaths
People educated at Harrow School
Alumni of Christ Church, Oxford
Members of Lincoln's Inn
Conservative Party (UK) MPs for English constituencies
Members of the Parliament of the United Kingdom for constituencies in Cornwall
Politicians from Cornwall
UK MPs 1880–1885